In mathematics, any vector space  has a corresponding dual vector space (or just dual space for short) consisting of all linear forms on , together with the vector space structure of pointwise addition and scalar multiplication by constants.

When defined for a topological vector space, there is a subspace of the dual space, corresponding to continuous linear functionals, called the continuous dual space

Dual vector spaces find application in many branches of mathematics that use vector spaces, such as in tensor analysis with finite-dimensional vector spaces.
When applied to vector spaces of functions (which are typically infinite-dimensional), dual spaces are used to describe measures, distributions, and Hilbert spaces. Consequently, the dual space is an important concept in functional analysis.

Early terms for dual include polarer Raum [Hahn 1927], espace conjugué, adjoint space [Alaoglu 1940], and transponierter Raum [Schauder 1930] and [Banach 1932]. The term dual is due to Bourbaki 1938.

Algebraic dual space 

Since linear maps are vector space homomorphisms, the dual space may be denoted .
The dual space  itself becomes a vector space over  when equipped with an addition and scalar multiplication satisfying:
 

Elements of the algebraic dual space  are sometimes called covectors, one-forms, or linear forms.

This pairing defines a nondegenerate bilinear mapping  called the natural pairing.

Finite-dimensional case 

If V is finite-dimensional, then V∗ has the same dimension as V. Given a basis  in V, it is possible to construct a specific basis in V∗, called the dual basis. This dual basis is a set  of linear functionals on V, defined by the relation
 
for any choice of coefficients . In particular, letting in turn each one of those coefficients be equal to one and the other coefficients zero, gives the system of equations
 
where  is the Kronecker delta symbol. This property is referred to as bi-orthogonality property.

Consider } the basis of V. Let } be defined as the following:

. 

We have:

  are linear functionals.
 Suppose .
Lastly, consider . Then

and } generates .

The basis vectors are not orthogonal to each other. (Note: The superscript here is the index, not an exponent.) This system of equations can be expressed using matrix notation as

Solving this equation shows the dual basis to be . Because e1 and e2 are functionals, they can be rewritten as e1(x, y) = 2x and e2(x, y) = −x + y.

In general, when V is Rn, if E = (e1, ..., en) is a matrix whose columns are the basis vectors and Ê = (e1, ..., en) is a matrix whose columns are the dual basis vectors, then

where In is the identity matrix of order . The biorthogonality property of these two basis sets allows any point x ∈ V to be represented as

even when the basis vectors are not orthogonal to each other.

In particular, Rn can be interpreted as the space of columns of  real numbers, its dual space is typically written as the space of rows of  real numbers. Such a row acts on Rn as a linear functional by ordinary matrix multiplication. This is because a functional maps every -vector x into a real number y. Then, seeing this functional as a matrix M, and x as an  matrix, and y a  matrix (trivially, a real number) respectively, if  then, by dimension reasons, M must be a  matrix; that is, M must be a row vector.

If V consists of the space of geometrical vectors in the plane, then the level curves of an element of V∗ form a family of parallel lines in V, because the range is 1-dimensional, so that every point in the range is a multiple of any one nonzero element.
So an element of V∗ can be intuitively thought of as a particular family of parallel lines covering the plane. To compute the value of a functional on a given vector, it suffices to determine which of the lines the vector lies on. Informally, this "counts" how many lines the vector crosses.
More generally, if V is a vector space of any dimension, then the level sets of a linear functional in V∗ are parallel hyperplanes in V, and the action of a linear functional on a vector can be visualized in terms of these hyperplanes.

Infinite-dimensional case 

If V is not finite-dimensional but has a basis eα indexed by an infinite set A, then the same construction as in the finite-dimensional case yields linearly independent elements eα of the dual space, but they will not form a basis.

The dual space of R∞ is (isomorphic to) RN, the space of all sequences of real numbers: each real sequence (an) defines a function where the element (xn) of R∞ is sent to the number

which is a finite sum because there are only finitely many nonzero xn. The dimension of R∞ is countably infinite, whereas RN does not have a countable basis.

This observation generalizes to any infinite-dimensional vector space V over any field F: a choice of basis  identifies V with the space (FA)0 of functions  such that  is nonzero for only finitely many , where such a function f is identified with the vector

in V (the sum is finite by the assumption on f, and any  may be written in this way by the definition of the basis).

The dual space of V may then be identified with the space FA of all functions from A to F: a linear functional T on V is uniquely determined by the values  it takes on the basis of V, and any function  (with ) defines a linear functional T on V by

Again the sum is finite because fα is nonzero for only finitely many α.

The set (FA)0 may be identified (essentially by definition) with the direct sum of infinitely many copies of F (viewed as a 1-dimensional vector space over itself) indexed by A, i.e. there are linear isomorphisms

On the other hand, FA is (again by definition), the direct product of infinitely many copies of F indexed by A, and so the identification

is a special case of a general result relating direct sums (of modules) to direct products.

Considering cardinal numbers, denoted here as absolute values, one has thus for a -vector space  that has an infinite basis 

It follows that, if a vector space is not finite-dimensional, then the axiom of choice implies that the algebraic dual space is always of larger dimension (as a cardinal number) than the original vector space (since, if two bases have the same cardinality, the spanned vector spaces have the same cardinality). This is in contrast to the case of the continuous dual space, discussed below, which may be isomorphic to the original vector space even if the latter is infinite-dimensional.

Bilinear products and dual spaces 

If V is finite-dimensional, then V is isomorphic to V∗. But there is in general no natural isomorphism between these two spaces.  Any bilinear form  on V gives a mapping of V into its dual space via

In other words, the bilinear form determines a linear mapping

defined by

If the bilinear form is nondegenerate, then this is an isomorphism onto a subspace of V∗.
If V is finite-dimensional, then this is an isomorphism onto all of V∗.  Conversely, any isomorphism  from V to a subspace of V∗ (resp., all of V∗ if V is finite dimensional) defines a unique nondegenerate bilinear form  on V by

Thus there is a one-to-one correspondence between isomorphisms of V to a subspace of (resp., all of) V∗ and nondegenerate bilinear forms on V.

If the vector space V is over the complex field, then sometimes it is more natural to consider sesquilinear forms instead of bilinear forms.
In that case, a given sesquilinear form  determines an isomorphism of V with the complex conjugate of the dual space

 
The conjugate of the dual space  can be identified with the set of all additive complex-valued functionals  such that

Injection into the double-dual 
This map  is always injective; it is an isomorphism if and only if  is finite-dimensional.
Indeed, the isomorphism of a finite-dimensional vector space with its double dual is an archetypal example of a natural isomorphism.
Infinite-dimensional Hilbert spaces are not isomorphic to their algebraic double duals, but instead to their continuous double duals.

Transpose of a linear map 

If  is a linear map, then the transpose (or dual)  is defined by
 
for every .

The following identity holds for all  and :
 
where the bracket [·,·] on the left is the natural pairing of V with its dual space, and that on the right is the natural pairing of W with its dual.  This identity characterizes the transpose, and is formally similar to the definition of the adjoint.

The assignment  produces an injective linear map between the space of linear operators from V to W and the space of linear operators from W to V; this homomorphism is an isomorphism if and only if W is finite-dimensional.
If  then the space of linear maps is actually an algebra under composition of maps, and the assignment is then an antihomomorphism of algebras, meaning that .
In the language of category theory, taking the dual of vector spaces and the transpose of linear maps is therefore a contravariant functor from the category of vector spaces over F to itself.
It is possible to identify  (f) with f using the natural injection into the double dual.

If the linear map f is represented by the matrix A with respect to two bases of V and W, then f is represented by the transpose matrix AT with respect to the dual bases of W and V, hence the name.
Alternatively, as f is represented by A acting on the left on column vectors, f is represented by the same matrix acting on the right on row vectors.
These points of view are related by the canonical inner product on Rn, which identifies the space of column vectors with the dual space of row vectors.

Quotient spaces and annihilators 

That is,  consists of all linear functionals  such that the restriction to  vanishes: .
Within finite dimensional vector spaces, the annihilator is dual to (isomorphic to) the orthogonal complement.

The annihilator of a subset is itself a vector space.
The annihilator of the zero vector is the whole dual space: , and the annihilator of the whole space is just the zero covector: .
Furthermore, the assignment of an annihilator to a subset of  reverses inclusions, so that if , then
 

 
and equality holds provided  is finite-dimensional. If  is any family of subsets of  indexed by  belonging to some index set , then
 
 

 
after identifying  with its image in the second dual space under the double duality isomorphism .  In particular, forming the annihilator is a Galois connection on the lattice of subsets of a finite-dimensional vector space.

If  is a subspace of  then the quotient space  is a vector space in its own right, and so has a dual. There is thus an isomorphism
 

Dimensional analysis 
The dual space is analogous to a "negative"-dimensional space. Most simply, since a vector  can be paired with a covector  by the natural pairing
 to obtain a scalar, a covector can "cancel" the dimension of a vector, similar to reducing a fraction. This is formalized by tensor contraction.

This arises in physics via dimensional analysis, where the dual space has inverse units. Under the natural pairing, these units cancel, and the resulting scalar value is dimensionless, as expected. For example in (continuous) Fourier analysis, or more broadly time–frequency analysis: given a one-dimensional vector space with a unit of time , the dual space has units of frequency: occurrences per unit of time (units of ). Similarly, if the primal space measures length, the dual space measures inverse length.

Continuous dual space 

When dealing with topological vector spaces, the continuous linear functionals from the space into the base field  (or ) are particularly important.
For any finite-dimensional normed vector space or topological vector space, such as Euclidean n-space, the continuous dual and the algebraic dual coincide.
This is however false for any infinite-dimensional normed space, as shown by the example of discontinuous linear maps.
Nevertheless, in the theory of topological vector spaces the terms "continuous dual space" and "topological dual space" are often replaced by "dual space".

For a topological vector space  its continuous dual space, or topological dual space, or just dual space (in the sense of the theory of topological vector spaces)  is defined as the space of all continuous linear functionals .

Important examples for continuous dual spaces are the space of compactly supported test functions  and its dual  the space of arbitrary distributions (generalized functions); the space of arbitrary test functions  and its dual  the space of compactly supported distributions; and the space of rapidly decreasing test functions  the Schwartz space, and its dual  the space of tempered distributions (slowly growing distributions) in the theory of generalized functions.

Properties 

Topologies on the dual 

There is a standard construction for introducing a topology on the continuous dual  of a topological vector space .

This means that a net of functionals  tends to a functional  in  if and only if

Usually (but not necessarily) the class  is supposed to satisfy the following conditions:
 Each point  of  belongs to some set :

  is closed under the operation of multiplication by scalars: 

form its local base.

Here are the three most important special cases.

Each of these three choices of topology on  leads to a variant of reflexivity property for topological vector spaces:
 If  is endowed with the strong topology, then the corresponding notion of reflexivity is the standard one: the spaces reflexive in this sense are just called reflexive.
 If  is endowed with the stereotype dual topology, then the corresponding reflexivity is presented in the theory of stereotype spaces: the spaces reflexive in this sense are called stereotype.
 If  is endowed with the weak topology, then the corresponding reflexivity is presented in the theory of dual pairs: the spaces reflexive in this sense are arbitrary (Hausdorff) locally convex spaces with the weak topology.

Examples 

Let 1 < p < ∞ be a real number and consider the Banach space ℓ p of all sequences  for which

for all  (see Hölder's inequality).

By the Riesz representation theorem, the continuous dual of a Hilbert space is again a Hilbert space which is anti-isomorphic to the original space.
This gives rise to the bra–ket notation used by physicists in the mathematical formulation of quantum mechanics.

By the Riesz–Markov–Kakutani representation theorem, the continuous dual of certain spaces of continuous functions can be described using measures.

Transpose of a continuous linear map 

If  is a continuous linear map between two topological vector spaces, then the (continuous) transpose   is defined by the same formula as before:

When T and U are composable continuous linear maps, then

Several properties of transposition depend upon the Hahn–Banach theorem.
For example, the bounded linear map T has dense range if and only if the transpose  is injective.

When T is a compact linear map between two Banach spaces V and W, then the transpose  is compact.
This can be proved using the Arzelà–Ascoli theorem.

When V is a Hilbert space, there is an antilinear isomorphism iV from V onto its continuous dual .
For every bounded linear map T on V, the transpose and the adjoint operators are linked by

Annihilators 

Then, the dual of the quotient  can be identified with W⊥, and the dual of W can be identified with the quotient .
Indeed, let P denote the canonical surjection from V onto the quotient ; then, the transpose  is an isometric isomorphism from  into , with range equal to W⊥.
If j denotes the injection map from W into V, then the kernel of the transpose  is the annihilator of W:

and it follows from the Hahn–Banach theorem that  induces an isometric isomorphism
.

Further properties 

If the dual of a normed space  is separable, then so is the space  itself.
The converse is not true: for example, the space  is separable, but its dual  is not.

Double dual 

In analogy with the case of the algebraic double dual, there is always a naturally defined continuous linear operator  from a normed space V into its continuous double dual , defined by

As a consequence of the Hahn–Banach theorem, this map is in fact an isometry, meaning  for all .
Normed spaces for which the map Ψ is a bijection are called reflexive.

When V is a topological vector space then Ψ(x) can still be defined by the same formula, for every , however several difficulties arise.
First, when V is not locally convex, the continuous dual may be equal to { 0 } and the map Ψ trivial.
However, if V is Hausdorff and locally convex, the map Ψ is injective from V to the algebraic dual  of the continuous dual, again as a consequence of the Hahn–Banach theorem.

Second, even in the locally convex setting, several natural vector space topologies can be defined on the continuous dual , so that the continuous double dual  is not uniquely defined as a set.

 

As a consequence, defining reflexivity in this framework is more involved than in the normed  case.

See also 
 Covariance and contravariance of vectors
 Dual module
 Dual norm
 Duality (mathematics)
 Duality (projective geometry)
 Pontryagin duality
 Reciprocal lattice – dual space basis, in crystallography

Notes

References

Bibliography
 
 
 
 
 
 
 
 .

External links
 

Functional analysis

Linear algebra
Space
Linear functionals